Maria Viktorovna Vasilevich is a Belarusian model and politician. Vasilevich studied at the Belarus State Economic University. She won the Miss Belarus 2018 pageant and finished in the top five at the Miss World beauty pageant in December. She became a member of the House of Representatives in 2019. Vasilevich was elected at the age of 22 and is the youngest member of the parliament.

References 

Living people
Members of the House of Representatives of Belarus
1997 births
Miss World 2018 delegates
Belarus State Economic University alumni